Harder Fjord is a fjord in Peary Land, far northern Greenland. 

The Harder Ford Fault Zone (HFFZ) is a geological structural feature in North Greenland named after the fjord.

Geography
Harder Fjord is the innermost branch of the Weyprecht Fjord system. Its southern shore forms the northern limit of Amundsen Land. To the north lies the southern end of Hazenland, Moa Island and Roosevelt Land. Cape Holger Danske is the headland to the south of the mouth of the fjord, in the inner Wild Sound area. 

The Dreng Glacier (Dreng Brae) has its terminus at the head of the fjord, deep inside the mainland of the Peary Land peninsula.

See also
List of fjords of Greenland

References

External links
Polyphase deformation at the Harder Fjord Fault Zone (North Greenland)
An occurrence of Tertiary shales from the Harder Fjord Fault, North Greenland fold belt, Peary Land
Fjords of Greenland
Peary Land